The 1989–90 Cypriot Second Division was the 35th season of the Cypriot second-level football league. EPA Larnaca won their 1st title.

Format
Fifteen teams participated in the 1989–90 Cypriot Second Division. All teams played against each other twice, once at their home and once away. The team with the most points at the end of the season crowned champions. The first two teams were promoted to 1990–91 Cypriot First Division. The last three teams were relegated to the 1990–91 Cypriot Third Division.

Changes from previous season
Teams promoted to 1989–90 Cypriot First Division
 Evagoras Paphos
 Alki Larnaca FC

Teams relegated from 1988–89 Cypriot First Division
 EPA Larnaca FC
 Keravnos Strovolou FC
 Omonia Aradippou

Teams promoted from 1988–89 Cypriot Third Division
 Digenis Akritas Ipsona
 AEZ Zakakiou

Teams relegated to 1989–90 Cypriot Third Division
 Adonis Idaliou
 ENTHOI Lakatamia FC
 Ermis Aradippou FC

League standings

References

See also
 Cypriot Second Division
 1989–90 Cypriot First Division
 1989–90 Cypriot Cup

Cypriot Second Division seasons
Cyprus
1989–90 in Cypriot football